Poison Pen Films is a film production company based in Leeds, Yorkshire, UK and affiliated to Metro Films. It is run as a collective by its members - Paul Morricone, Dave Aspinall. Joe Costello and Nous Vous. The company specialises in music video production using staged material, various forms of animation and CGI.

Poison Pen have created music video clips for artists including The Young Knives, The Pigeon Detectives, Graham Coxon, The Scaramanga Six, The Holloways, Eureka Machines Larrikin Love, Marvin The Martian, The Whip, The Go! Team, Little Man Tate, iLiKETRAiNS, Cold War Kids, Forward Russia, Gallows and Polytechnic as well as viral animations for The Charlatans.

External links
Poison Pen Films homepage

Film production companies of the United Kingdom
Companies based in Leeds
Entertainment companies of the United Kingdom
Music production companies